Superstar Hits is a compilation album released in 2002 and re-released in 2004 with new songs for tracks 12–16 by Walt Disney Records. It features songs from popular Disney movies by mainstream artists like Celine Dion, Tina Turner, and Christina Aguilera.

Track listings

2002 version

2004 re-release

References

2002 compilation albums
Walt Disney Records compilation albums